The ancient Egyptian noble Ibi (sometime transliterated as Aba or Abe) was chief steward of the God's Wife of Amun, Nitocris I, during the reign of the 26th Dynasty pharaoh Psamtik I.

He was buried in a large tomb, TT36, located in the El-Assasif district of the Theban Necropolis, opposite Luxor, in Egypt. His sarcophagus lid is exhibited in the Museo Egizio of Turin, Italy.

References

Ancient Egyptian high stewards
People of the Twenty-sixth Dynasty of Egypt